Hermitage Peak may refer to:

 Hermitage Peak (Antarctica)
 Hermitage Peak (British Columbia)